"God of the gaps" is a theological perspective in which gaps in scientific knowledge are taken to be evidence or proof of God's existence.

Origins of the term
From the 1880s, Friedrich Nietzsche's Thus Spoke Zarathustra, Part Two, "On Priests", said "... into every gap they put their delusion, their stopgap, which they called God".
The concept, although not the exact wording, goes back to Henry Drummond, a 19th-century evangelist lecturer, from his 1893 Lowell Lectures on The Ascent of Man. He chastises those Christians who point to the things that science has not explained—"gaps which they will fill up with God"—and urges them to embrace all nature as God's, as the work of "an immanent God, which is the God of Evolution, is infinitely grander than the occasional wonder-worker, who is the God of an old theology."

In 1933, Ernest Barnes, the Bishop of Birmingham, used the phrase in a discussion of general relativity's implication of a Big Bang:

During World War II the German theologian and martyr Dietrich Bonhoeffer expressed the concept in similar terms in letters he wrote while in a Nazi prison. Bonhoeffer wrote, for example:

In his 1955 book Science and Christian Belief Charles Alfred Coulson (1910−1974) wrote:

and

Coulson was a mathematics professor at Oxford University as well as a Methodist church leader, often appearing in the religious programs of British Broadcasting Corporation. His book got national attention, was reissued as a paperback, and was reprinted several times, most recently in 1971.
It is claimed that the actual phrase 'God of the gaps' was invented by Coulson.

The term was then used in a 1971 book and a 1978 article, by Richard Bube. He articulated the concept in greater detail in Man come of Age: Bonhoeffer’s Response to the God-of-the-Gaps (1978). Bube attributed modern crises in religious faith in part to the inexorable shrinking of the God-of-the-gaps as scientific knowledge progressed. As humans progressively increased their understanding of nature, the previous "realm" of God seemed to many persons and religions to be getting smaller and smaller by comparison. Bube maintained that Darwin's Origin of Species was the "death knell" of the God-of-the-gaps. Bube also maintained that the God-of-the-gaps was not the same as the God of the Bible (that is, he was not making an argument against God per se, but rather asserting there was a fundamental problem with the perception of God as existing in the gaps of present-day knowledge).

General usage
The term "God of the gaps" is sometimes used in describing the incremental retreat of religious explanations of physical phenomena in the face of increasingly comprehensive scientific explanations for those phenomena. Dorothy Dinnerstein includes psychological explanations for developmental distortions leading to a person believing in a deity, particularly a male deity.

R. Laird Harris writes of the physical science aspect of this:
The expression, "God of the Gaps," contains a real truth. It is erroneous if it is taken to mean that God is not immanent in natural law but is only to be observed in mysteries unexplained by law. No significant Christian group has believed this view. It is true, however, if it be taken to emphasize that God is not only immanent in natural law but also is active in the numerous phenomena associated with the supernatural and the spiritual. There are gaps in a physical-chemical explanation of this world, and there always will be. Because science has learned many marvelous secrets of nature, it cannot be concluded that it can explain all phenomena. Meaning, soul, spirits, and life are subjects incapable of physical-chemical explanation or formation.

Usage in referring to a type of argument

The term God-of-the-gaps fallacy can refer to a position that assumes an act of God as the explanation for an unknown phenomenon, which according to the users of the term, is a variant of an argument from ignorance fallacy. Such an argument is sometimes reduced to the following form:
There is a gap in understanding of some aspect of the natural world.
Therefore, the cause must be supernatural.
One example of such an argument, which uses God as an explanation of one of the current gaps in biological science, is as follows:
"Because current science can't figure out exactly how life started, it must be God who caused life to start." Critics of intelligent design creationism, for example, have accused proponents of using this basic type of argument.

God-of-the-gaps arguments have been discouraged by some theologians who assert that such arguments tend to relegate God to the leftovers of science: as scientific knowledge increases, the dominion of God decreases.

Criticism
The term was invented as a criticism of people who perceive that God only acts in the gaps, and who restrict God's activity to such "gaps". It has also been argued that the God-of-the-gaps view is predicated on the assumption that any event which can be explained by science automatically excludes God; that if God did not do something via direct action, that he had no role in it at all.

The "God of the gaps" argument, as traditionally advanced by scholarly Christians, was intended as a criticism against weak or tenuous faith, not as a statement against theism or belief in God.

According to John Habgood in The Westminster Dictionary of Christian Theology, the phrase is generally derogatory, and is inherently a direct criticism of a tendency to postulate acts of God to explain phenomena for which science has not (at least at present) given a satisfactory account. Habgood also states:

It is theologically more satisfactory to look for evidence of God's actions within natural processes rather than apart from them, in much the same way that the meaning of a book transcends, but is not independent of, the paper and ink of which it is comprised.

It has been criticized by both theologians and scientists, who say that it is a logical fallacy to base belief in God on gaps in scientific knowledge. In this vein, Richard Dawkins, an atheist, dedicates a chapter of his book The God Delusion to criticism of the God-of-the-gaps argument.
Other scientists holding religious beliefs, such as Francis Collins, reject a God-of-the-gaps while embracing the idea of a God who fine tuned the universe precisely so human life could exist.

See also
 Deus ex machina
 Non-overlapping magisteria
 The Challenge of Creation
 Watchmaker analogy

References

Bibliography
 Dietrich Bonhoeffer, Letters and Papers from Prison, New York: Simon & Schuster, 1997 "Letter to Eberhard Bethge", 29 May 1944, pages 310–312.
 Richard H. Bube, "Man Come of Age: Bonhoeffer's Response to the God-Of-The-Gaps," Journal of the Evangelical Theological Society, volume 14 fall (1971), pages 203–220.
 C. A. Coulson, Science and Christian Belief (The John Calvin McNair Lectures, 1954), London: Oxford University Press, 1955. Page 20, see also page 28.
 Henry Drummond, The Lowell Lectures on the Ascent of Man, Glasgow: Hodder and Stoughton, 1904 (Chapter 10, containing the relevant text).

External links

 Miracles, Intelligent Design, and God-of-the-Gaps (PDF)
 Skeptical Christian: God of the Gaps?

Arguments for the existence of God
Religion and science